The National Research Institute of Police Science (NRIPS) is an attached organization of the National Police Agency of Japan.

Its role includes: research and development,  identification and analysis, and training.

Address 
6-3-1, Kashiwanoha, Kashiwa, Chiba Prefecture, Japan

Organization 

President (Technical officer)
Vice President (Technical officer)
Department of General Affairs- General Affairs Section, Accounting Section
First Department of Forensic Science - First Biology Section, Second Biology Section, Third Biology Section, Fourth Biology Section, Fifth Biology Section
Second Department of Forensic Science - Physics Section, Fire Investigation Section, Explosion Investigation Section, Mechanical Section
Third Department of Forensic Science - First Chemistry Section, Second Chemistry Section, Third Chemistry Section, Fourth Chemistry Section, Fifth Chemistry Section
Fourth Department of Forensic Science - First Information Science Section, Second Information Section, Third Information Section
Department of Criminology and Behavioral Science - Juvenile Section,  Crime Prevention Section, Investigation Support Section
Department of Traffic Science - First Traffic Science Section, Second Traffic Science Section, Third Traffic Science Section
Research Coordinator
Identification Center 
Training Center of Forensic Science

External links 
Official website

Law enforcement in Japan